Patrick Torreilles is a French rugby league footballer who represented France at the 1995 World Cup.

Playing career
Torreilles played 19 tests for France between 1991 and 1997, including at the 1995 World Cup and the 1996 European Championship.

In 1996, he played for Paris Saint-Germain in the Super League competition.

He also played for France at the 1997 Super League World Nines.

References

Living people
French rugby league players
France national rugby league team players
1969 births
Rugby league hookers
Place of birth missing (living people)
Paris Saint-Germain Rugby League players